BNI City station is a station for the Soekarno-Hatta Airport Rail Link and KAI Commuter service. Bank Negara Indonesia (BNI) holds the naming rights for the station, which was known as Sudirman Baru station (English: New Sudirman station) during construction period. The station is located in Central Jakarta, on the north bank of West Flood Canal, about a hundred meters from Sudirman Commuter Rail station. The station is part of Dukuh Atas TOD.

History 
Initially this station was named Sudirman Baru because it is located on the west side of Jalan Jenderal Sudirman. This means that the name of this station must be distinguished from the Old Sudirman Station, which only serves Commuter Line routes. Bank Negara Indonesia (BNI), Kereta Api Indonesia (KAI), and Railink have agreed to name this station as BNI City as a strategy to create synergies between state-owned enterprises. BNI participates in managing this station with PT Railink and PT KAI;  by providing supporting facilities such as ATMs and ticket machines.

Sudirman Baru Station began serving passengers on December 26 2017 and was inaugurated on January 2, 2018. With the presence of this station, it will facilitate the mobility of airport passengers, both from Soekarno–Hatta International Airport and from Jakarta and Tangerang.

As of July 30th, 2022, BNI City start serving KAI Commuter Cikarang Loop Line's passengers. This operation is aim to share the density of passengers at Sudirman Station by 40%. This operations are carried out by separating the gate and the flow of incoming/outgoing passengers between Commuter Line and KRL ARS Airport (Airlink), but the platform has not been separated between the two services. Anne Purba as the VP Corporate Secretary of KAI Commuter denied reports that the Karet Station would be closed due to the operation of the KRL in Sudirman Baru.

Naming rights 
It is the first railway station in Indonesia which granted its naming rights to a corporation.

Station layout 
This station have two train tracks. Both tracks are  straight tracks.

On the ground floor, a number of station support facilities such as escalators, tap-in and tap-out machines, ticket vending machines, two seating areas for passengers, and lifts are located. There are also food outlets, minimarkets, toilets, mosques, clinics, and self-service flight check-in machines. 

There are four escalators in the station. The station has a parking lot.

Services

KRL Commuterline

Airport Rail Link

Other public transportation 
As the station is part of Dukuh Atas TOD, it is integrated with several mode of public transportation available in Jakarta. The station is located on the north bank of the West Flood Canal, about hundred meters away from Sudirman station of Jakarta Commuter service. Before May 28th, 2022 Sudirman station only serves  Loop Line, after May 28th Loop Line ceased and replaced with  Cikarang Loop Line.

TransJakarta operates 4 feeder routes from the Dukuh Atas TOD area with a fare of Rp 3,500 (about 25 US cents). Transit to the main corridor is not possible from these 4 routes. The routes are:
 Corridor DA1 Dukuh Atas TOD - Sam Ratulangi
 Corridor DA2 Dukuh Atas TOD - Tanah Abang
 Corridor DA3 Dukuh Atas TOD - Kuningan
 Corridor DA4 Dukuh Atas TOD - Kota

Aside from the Dukuh Atas TOD routes, there are a number of routes that stop by the TOD area. The routes are:
 Corridor 1N (Tanah Abang - Blok M) towards Tanah Abang
 Corridor 1P (Bundaran Senayan - Senen) towards Senen
 Corridor 9D (Tanah Abang - Pasar Minggu) towards Tanah Abang
 Corridor GR1 (Harmoni - Bundaran Senayan) towards Harmoni
The station can also be reached by Corridor 1 from Tosari shelter or Dukuh Atas 1 Shelter, Corridors 4 and 6 from Dukuh Atas 2 Shelter.

The station is already integrated with Jakarta MRT BNI City station and will be integrated with Jakarta LRT in the future.

Some regular buses also stops by the TOD area. All routes are towards Tanah Abang:
 Mayasari Bakti AC52 (Tanah Abang - Bekasi Timur)
 Mayasari Bakti AC52A (Tanah Abang - Jatiasih)
 Mayasari Bakti AC70 (Tanah Abang - Kampung Rambutan)
 Mayasari Bakti AC70A (Tanah Abang - Cileungsi)
 Mayasari Bakti (Tanah Abang - Ciawi)
 Kopaja P19 (Tanah Abang - Blok M - Ragunan Depan)
 MetroMini S640 (Tanah Abang - Pasar Minggu)

See also
Soekarno–Hatta International Airport
Soekarno–Hatta Airport Rail Link
KRL Commuterline

References

External links
 

central Jakarta
Railway stations in Jakarta
Railway stations opened in 2017
2017 establishments in Indonesia